The 2018–19 Biathlon World Cup – Stage 7 was the seventh event of the season and was held in Canmore, Canada, from 7–10 February 2019.

Schedule of events 
The events took place at the following times.

Medal winners

Men

Women

Notes

References 

2018–19 Biathlon World Cup
2019 in Canadian sports
Biathlon World Cup - Stage 7
Biathlon competitions in Canada